Stephen Rice may refer to:

Stephen Rice (footballer) (born 1984), Irish footballer
Stephen O. Rice (1907–1986), American electrical engineer
Stephen Rice (journalist) (born 1957), Australian journalist
Stephen Rice (judge) (1637–1715), chief baron of the exchequer in Ireland
Stephen Rice (academic) (fl. 1990s–2020s), geographer
Stephen Spring Rice (1814–1865), Anglo-Irish civil servant and philanthropist
Stephen Spring Rice (1856–1902), British civil servant and academic
Stephen E. Rice (c. 1905–1958), United States Tax Court judge

See also
Steven Rice (born 1971), ice hockey player
Steven Rice (composer) (born 1979), American composer